Alpha-thalassemia (α-thalassemia, α-thalassaemia) is a form of thalassemia involving the genes HBA1 and HBA2. Thalassemias are a group of inherited blood conditions which result in the impaired production of hemoglobin, the molecule that carries oxygen in the blood. Normal hemoglobin consists of two alpha chains and two beta chains; in alpha-thalassemia, there is a quantitative decrease in the amount of alpha chains, resulting in fewer normal hemoglobin molecules. Furthermore, alpha-thalassemia leads to the production of unstable beta globin molecules which cause increased red blood cell destruction. The degree of impairment is based on which clinical phenotype is present (how many genes are affected).

Signs and symptoms

The presentation of individuals with alpha-thalassemia consists of:

Cause
Alpha-thalassemias are most commonly inherited in a Mendelian recessive manner. They are also associated with deletions of chromosome 16p. Alpha thalassemia can also be acquired under rare circumstances.

Pathophysiology
The mechanism sees that α thalassemias results in decreased alpha-globin production, therefore fewer alpha-globin chains are produced, resulting in an excess of β chains in adults and excess γ chains in newborns. The excess β chains form unstable tetramers called hemoglobin H or HbH of four beta chains. The excess γ chains form tetramers which are poor carriers of O2 since their affinity for O2 is too high, so it is not dissociated in the periphery. Homozygote α0 thalassaemias, where numerous γ4 but no α-globins occur at all (referred to as Hb Barts), often result in death soon after birth.

Diagnosis
Diagnosis of alpha-thalassemia is primarily by laboratory evaluation and molecular diagnosis. Alpha-thalassemia can be mistaken for iron-deficiency anaemia on a full blood count or blood film, as both conditions have a microcytic anaemia. Serum iron and serum ferritin can be used to exclude iron-deficiency anaemia.

Types
Two genetic loci exist for α globin, thus four alleles are in diploid cells. Two alleles are maternal and two alleles are paternal in origin.  The severity of the α-thalassemias is correlated with the number of affected α-globin alleles: the greater, the more severe will be the manifestations of the disease. When noting the genotype, an "α" indicates a functional alpha chain, and '-' a pathological one.

Laboratory diagnosis 
The ability to measure hemoglobin Barts makes it useful in newborn screening tests.  If hemoglobin Barts is detected on a newborn screen, the patient is usually referred for further evaluation since detection of hemoglobin Barts can indicate either one alpha globin gene deletion, making the baby a silent alpha thalassemia carrier, two alpha globin gene deletions (alpha thalassemia), or hemoglobin H disease (three alpha globin gene deletions).

Deletion of four alpha globin genes was previously felt to be incompatible with life, but there are currently 69 patients who have survived past infancy. All such children too show high level of hemoglobin Barts on newborn screen along with other variants.

Post-newborn ages, initial laboratory diagnosis should include a complete blood count and red blood cell indices. As well, a peripheral blood smear should be carefully reviewed. In hemoglobin H disease, red blood cells containing hemoglobin H inclusions can be visualized on the blood smear using new methylene blue or brilliant cresyl blue stain.

Hemoglobin analysis is important for the diagnosis of alpha-thalassemia as it determines the types and percentages of types of hemoglobin present. Several different methods of hemoglobin analysis exist, including hemoglobin electrophoresis, capillary electrophoresis and high-performance liquid chromatography.

Molecular analysis of DNA sequences (DNA analysis) can be used for the confirmation of a diagnosis of alpha-thalassemia, particularly for the detection of alpha-thalassemia carriers (deletions or mutations in only one or two alpha-globin genes).

Treatment

Treatment for alpha-thalassemia may include blood transfusions to maintain hemoglobin at a level that reduces symptoms of anemia. The decision to initiate transfusions depends on the clinical severity of the disease. Splenectomy is a possible treatment option to increase total hemoglobin levels in cases of worsening anemia due to an overactive or enlarged spleen, or when transfusion therapy is not possible. However, splenectomy is avoided when other options are available due to an increased risk of serious infections and thrombosis.

Additionally, gallstones may be a problem that would require surgery. Secondary complications from febrile episode should be monitored, and most individuals live without any need for treatment. Additionally, stem cell transplantation should be considered as a treatment (and cure), which is best done in early age. Other options, such as gene therapy, are still being developed.

A study by Kreger et al combining a retrospective review of three cases of alpha thalassemia major and a literature review of 17 cases found that in utero transfusion can lead to favorable outcomes. Successful hematopoietic cell transplantation was eventually carried out in four patients.

Epidemiology

Worldwide distribution of inherited alpha-thalassemia corresponds to areas of malaria exposure, suggesting a protective role. Thus, alpha-thalassemia is common in sub-Saharan Africa, the Mediterranean Basin, and generally tropical (and subtropical) regions. The epidemiology of alpha-thalassemia in the US reflects this global distribution pattern. More specifically,  HbH disease is seen in Southeast Asia and the Middle East, while Hb Bart hydrops fetalis is acknowledged in Southeast Asia only.
The data indicate that 15% of the Greek and Turkish Cypriots are carriers of beta-thalassaemia genes, while 10% of the population carry alpha-thalassaemia genes.

See also 
 Beta-thalassemia
 Delta-thalassemia
 Hemoglobinopathy

References

Further reading

External links 
 

Disorders of globin and globulin proteins
Hereditary hemolytic anemias